Henri Kiviaho (born February 26, 1994) is a Finnish ice hockey goaltender currently playing with Mountfield HK in the Czech Extraliga. While playing with KalPa in the Liiga, Kiviaho was selected by the Dallas Stars in the 5th round (144th overall) of the 2012 NHL Entry Draft.

Playing career
On July 7, 2014, Kiviaho was signed to a three-year entry-level contract with the Stars. In his first North American season in 2014–15, Kiviaho was assigned to ECHL affiliate, the Idaho Steelheads. Kiviaho recorded 10 wins in 21 games, however was unable to earn a recall to the American Hockey League.

On July 31, 2015, Kiviaho was returned to Finland on loan by the Stars, to compete for the starting position in the Liiga with Ilves Tampere.

After a second stint in North America with the Idaho Steelheads, Kiviaho concluded his contract with the Stars unable to make progression in their depth chart. On April 18, 2017, Kiviaho agreed to an optional two-year deal to return to Finland with Ässät of the Liiga.

References

External links

1994 births
Living people
Ässät players
Dallas Stars draft picks
Finnish ice hockey goaltenders
Idaho Steelheads (ECHL) players
Iisalmen Peli-Karhut players
Ilves players
KalPa players
Lempäälän Kisa players
HC Nové Zámky players
Stadion Hradec Králové players
Finnish expatriate ice hockey players in Slovakia
People from Lappeenranta
Sportspeople from South Karelia
Finnish expatriate ice hockey players in the United States
Finnish expatriate ice hockey players in the Czech Republic